Van der Meijden is a Dutch surname. Notable people with the surname include:

Henk van der Meijden (born 1937), Dutch journalist and theatre manager
Ilse van der Meijden (born 1988), Dutch water polo player

See also
Van der Meij / Meij
Van der Heijden

Dutch-language surnames